Phassus n-signatus is a moth of the family Hepialidae. It is known from Guatemala.

References

Moths described in 1907
Hepialidae